The M4 Motorway is a  partially tolled dual carriageway motorway in Sydney, New South Wales that is designated the M4 route marker. The M4 designation is part of the wider A4 and M4 route designation, the M4 runs parallel/below ground to the Great Western Highway and Parramatta Road (A44).

The M4 Motorway comprises three connected parts:
It was completed and opened to traffic on 13 July 2019 as part of the WestConnex.
The extension was partially completed and opened on 20 January 2023 as part of the WestConnex while the remaining section between Leichhardt and Rozelle will open in late 2023.

The M4 cycleway runs parallel to the M4 Motorway between Sydney Olympic Park and South Wentworthville.

Sections

Alignment

The first main road west from Sydney was the Great Western Highway, shown above in orange. The County of Cumberland planning scheme provided for a modified route west, much of which was later built as the M4 Western Motorway. With the opening of the M4 East tunnel in 2019, the M4 extends as far east as Dalhousie Street, Haberfield.

Western Motorway

The Western Motorway was originally constructed in several stages as the F4 Western Freeway between the late 1960s and the mid-1980s: the first 5km-long section between Emu Plains and Regentville (including a new bridge over the Nepean River) opened in October 1971; the second 14.5km-long section between Regentville and Eastern Creek opened in December 1972; the third 4km-long section between Eastern Creek and Prospect opened in April 1974. In December 1989 work to construct this stage began as a Build-Own-Operate-Transfer project. In return for funding construction StateWide Roads, the consortium awarded to build the stage, was given permission to toll the section between James Ruse Drive and Silverwater Road as traffic volumes on this section were significantly higher than between Mays Hill-Prospect and would allow a shorter toll period with lower tolls. The consortium would also widen the section between James Ruse Drive and the newly constructed Homebush Bay Drive to six lanes. The Mays Hill to Prospect section opened in May 1992 and an initial of a $1.50 toll was implemented. The concession held by StateWide Roads ended on 15 February 2010, with operation of the motorway returned to the Roads and Traffic Authority and the toll removed. At the time, StateWide Roads was owned by Transurban (50.6%) and Utilities Trust of Australia (21.5%).

The motorway is mostly three or four lanes wide in either direction, and carries constant heavy traffic during daylight hours, seven days a week. Built as a four-lane motorway, it was widened to six lanes during 1998 to 2000, but this did little to ease the congestion.

Originally planned in the mid-1950s to start in the Sydney central business district, the eastern section was built only as far west as Pyrmont, as part of the North West Expressway, or F3, a freeway that would connect the Sydney and Newcastle central business districts. This section is now part of the Western Distributor. From there it was to have joined with the Western Expressway, the F4, and the Southern Expressway, the F6, in Glebe. This would have bypassed the Lapstone Hill area and avoided the sharp bends as the road enters Glenbrook. In December 1989 the extension of the freeway from Russell Street, west to the Great Western Highway in the vicinity of Governors Drive would bypass the narrow and winding section of the Great Western Highway, including the historic Knapsack Bridge.

In 2013, the state government announced the intention to implement a 'Managed Motorway' scheme on the M4 over the coming years to improve traffic flow. Mechanisms to be used include improved Variable Message Signs, Ramp metering signals, dynamic speed and incident management, and an upgrade of the Emergency Telephone System.

The Western Motorway used to be part of the Sydney Metroad 4 until 2013, when the new M4 route designation was proclaimed along the whole motorway.

Construction commenced in March 2015 and in November 2015, it was announced that toll points would be reinstated on this section from 2017 to cover costs of the WestConnex project. The toll was introduced on 15 August 2017.

M4 East

Over the years a number of proposals were made to extend the M4 east towards the city. One plan in the 1990s involved extending the M4 eastwards by approximately  so that it would subsequently end in Ashfield and be continuous with the City West Link. Further planned upgrades to the City West Link would mean commuters going west out of the city could get to Parramatta without passing through traffic lights.

The government proposed a subsequent $7 billion plan for M4 East in July 2002, including three options:
 short tunnel option: a  tunnel between the M4 at Concord and City West Link and Parramatta Road at Haberfield
 long tunnel option: a  tunnel between the M4 at Concord and City West Link at Lilyfield
 slot option: a sunken trench road similar to the Eastern Distributor, between the M4 at Concord and Parramatta Road at Haberfield
All three options would run below or parallel to Parramatta Road and/or City West Link. The short tunnel option was preferred for having lower costs both during construction and operation. The long tunnel option was considered to have the potential to increase congestion on the approaches to Anzac Bridge, causing eastbound queues to extend into the tunnels. The slot option could be constructed at a similar cost to the short tunnel, however, it was considered to not provide the same level of traffic benefits as the short tunnel option. Additionally, the option would need to acquire additional properties and the construction period for this option would be longer.

Between 2003 and 2004, the preferred short tunnel option for M4 East was exhibited. Members of the government were divided over the M4 East proposal and ultimately did not proceed with it in early 2005 due to community opposition. The preferred option eventually formed the basis of the concept design for the M4 East project of the WestConnex. 

In the month prior to the 2011 state election, the NRMA released a report in which it recommended building a tunnel to connect the end of the M4 at Concord and the start of the City West Link, relieving Parramatta Road of enough traffic to convert it into two lanes for slower-moving local traffic, two lanes of light rail and a cycleway. The report argued that this would allow Parramatta Road to be transformed with medium-density housing, shops and cafes and that the $10.04 billion in additional stamp duty and other revenues from this would pay for the $7.38 billion price tag of the project.

In October 2012, the NSW Government announced their commitment to deliver the WestConnex project, involving widening the existing M4 motorway as well as extending it east with a tunnel from North Strathfield to Taverners Hill. The project also involved duplicating the M5 East tunnel and building a new tunnel linking the M4 and M5 motorways.

In June 2015, the tender to design and build the M4 East was awarded to Leighton Contractors, Samsung and John Holland. Located  beneath Parramatta Road, the  dual-tunnel was funded through a $1.8 billion grant from the NSW Government and, from the Australian Government, a $1.5 billion grant and concessional loan of up to $2 billion, plus user tolling. The M4 East opened to traffic on 13 July 2019 and tolls were levied on both the M4 East Tunnel ($4.41 in 2020, comprising a flagfall and a change per distance travelled, subject to indexing) and the widening of the M4 between Parramatta and Homebush (base of $4.21 each way, subject to indexing). Both tolls will continue until 2060.

M4–M8 extensions 
Stage 3 of the WestConnex scheme saw a new motorway connection running from the end of the M4 at Haberfield to connect with the airport and the M8 Motorway (formerly the New M5) at St Peters, along with an interchange at  linking to the Anzac Bridge and Victoria Road (Iron Cove Bridge). This section would aim to reduce travel times between Western Sydney and Port Botany while removing heavy vehicles from surface streets in the Inner West 

In September 2022, the government announced that the connection would be referred to as extensions of the M4 and M8 when the connection opened. The connection to Rozelle Interchange (and a further extension of the M4 and M8 route markers) will open in late 2023.

M4 Smart Motorway Project 
In July 2019, the NSW government announced its M4 Smart Motorway Project which involves widening the on and off ramps for the untolled section of the motorway between Lapstone and Mays Hill, including the installation of overhead gantries with variable speed limit displays and traffic signals on the on-ramps between Orchard Hills and Mays Hill for traffic metering during peak periods.

Toll

Toll points are located at entrances and exits along this section. The toll charge consists of:
a flagfall
a charge per kilometre
Tolls for heavy vehicles are triple of cars and motorcycles. Toll prices increase by 4% or the consumer price index (CPI) every year, whichever is greater, until 2040, after which CPI will apply.

A toll point was previously introduced between James Ruse Drive and Silverwater Road in both directions until the toll was removed on 16 February 2010, when the M4 ownership was returned to the state government.

Exits and interchanges

See also

 Freeways in Australia
 Freeways in Sydney
 Metroad 4

References

External links 
Timelapse footage of the whole M4 Motorway on YouTube

Highways in Sydney
Toll roads in Australia
Municipality of Strathfield
Inner West Council
Cumberland Council, New South Wales
City of Parramatta
City of Blacktown
City of Penrith
Toll tunnels in Australia
Tunnels in Sydney